Vangelis Bebis (alternate spellings: Evangelos, Bebis) (Greek: Βαγγέλης Μπέμπης; born January 7, 1995) is a Greek professional basketball player for Ionikos Nikaias of the Greek Basket League.

College career
In the 2014–15 season, Bebis played college basketball for the Iona Gaels team, at Iona College. He played in 27 games, and averaged 1.8 points, 0.7 rebounds, 0.3 assists, and 0.3 steals per game, in 8.6 minutes per game. In August 2015, after playing one season with Iona College, Bebis left the school, and returned to Greece to play professionally.

Professional career
Bebis start his professional career with Ilysiakos in 2011. In 2015, he signed with Lavrio. In 2022, he returned to the 1st division for Ionikos Nikaias.

References

External links
 RealGM.com Profile
 Fiba.com Profile
 ESPN.com Profile
 NBAdraft.net Profile
 Washingtonpost.com Profile

1995 births
Living people
Greek men's basketball players
Greek Basket League players
Greek expatriate basketball people in the United States
Iona Gaels men's basketball players
Lavrio B.C. players
Shooting guards
Small forwards